Slylock Fox is a daily comic strip created by Bob Weber Jr. and published by King Features Syndicate. Bob Weber Jr. is the son of Bob Weber Sr., creator of the comic strip Moose & Molly. As the comic's name implies, the target audience is young children. According to the official website, Slylock Fox appears in nearly 400 newspapers with a combined readership of over 30 million.

Overview
Slylock Fox regularly features a logic puzzle presented in a single panel. Slylock, an anthropomorphic fox detective, is constantly matching wits against a variety of criminals, including Count Weirdly, Shady Shrew and Slick Smitty. The strip does not normally use dialogue; instead, text accompanying the illustration informs the reader of a problem Slylock must solve. These often include escaping from a dungeon, locating stolen goods, or determining who committed a crime through visual clues or logical inconsistencies. The puzzle solution is printed upside down.

Slylock is assisted by sidekick Max Mouse. Max wears pink shorts and a matching bowler hat. He functions as Slylock's foil, being distracted at the crime scene or coming to a false conclusion, only to be corrected by Slylock.

A varied cast of witnesses, victims, policemen and criminals fill in the rest of Slylock's world. These characters' names usually contain either some form of alliteration, a type of animal, a profession, or a personality trait. This allows Weber to quickly establish a scene and set up a mystery using very little space. Some notable examples include Deputy Duck, Roxy Rabbit, and Shady Shrew. Most of these characters are seen once and/or never again.

Slylock's name is likely an homage to the fictional detective Sherlock Holmes. Like Sherlock, Slylock is traditionally depicted with a magnifying glass and a blue deerstalker hat; also, he wears a blue suit and cape.

The Slylock Fox logic puzzles appear only in Sunday and Monday strips. The Tuesday to Saturday strips consist of spot the difference puzzles, trivia challenges, how-to-draw tutorials, and other activities. The Sunday edition features both Slylock and the activities.

Slylock Fox had an iPhone game called "Slylock Fox Spot the Differences". The iPhone app provides children of all ages the ability to test their observation skills with fifty of Bob Weber Jr.'s favorite spot the differences puzzles.

Media
The now-defunct Slylock Fox website featured many additional Slylock mysteries that have never been printed, in addition to other activities. The site was voted an "Educational Best Bet" by USA Today and received an award for "Best of the Net" from About.com in April 1999. The site currently redirects to the official page for Weber's other comic strip, Oh, Brother!.

Slylock Fox and Cassandra Cat guest starred in a week of My Cage comic strips in October 2007.

Stephan Pastis made a parody of Slylock Fox in his comic strip Pearls Before Swine on January 13, 2008; Weber reciprocated by having Rat and Pig, the two main characters from Pearls, appear in Slylock on February 3, 2008.  Pastis repeated with another parody on April 24, 2016.

A Slylock Fox mystery puzzle reprint book titled Go Fun Slylock Fox Mystery Puzzles and a Spot Six Differences reprint book titled Go Fun Spot Six Differences have been released by Andrews McMeel Publishing.

Main characters
In addition to a large cast of one-time characters, the strip has a handful of heroes and villains.

Protagonists
Slylock Fox, a fox detective who relies on logic and observation. He normally appears quite stoic.
Max Mouse, Slylock's sidekick. He occasionally finds clues that Slylock misses, but is usually less focused.
Chief Mutt and Deputy Duck, the local police, a bulldog and duck.
Tiffany Fox and Melody Mouse, two friendly bystanders and occasional victims. They sometimes act as romantic interests for Slylock and Max.
Sir Hound
Granny Squirrel
Rachel Rabbit
Princess Pussycat

Antagonists
Slick Smitty, one of the few humans, a perpetually smug con-artist and recurring villain.
Cassandra Cat, a jewel thief who gets by on her charm and beauty. Slylock seems to be the only one who is not fazed.
Count Weirdly, an eccentric scientist who lives in a castle full of creepy creatures and monsters. His crimes range from dangerously insane to simple cons.
Shady Shrew, a lower class citizen in a run-down house who constantly steals and lies.
Reeky Rat, a conniving, stealing, lying mullet-headed rat that lives in a trailer down by the river.
Harry Ape, a big gorilla that has a habit of robbing banks. His short, white-haired mama ape often offers false alibis for her felonious offspring.
Koppy Kat, a painting forger known for always leaving some sort of error in the paintings.
Big Brad Wolf, a lowlife single father to his son, Little Brad Wolf.
Rodney Rat
Buford Bull
Bertha Bear
Wanda Weasel
Lady Lynx
Wanda Witch

Collections
Reprints of the different activities featured in Slylock Fox are distributed through Slylock Fox' official store.

 Find the Six Differences #1
 Find the Six Differences #2
 Find the Six Differences #3
 Bob Weber Jr.'s How To Draw Cartoons
 Bob Weber Jr.'s Slylock Fox Mystery Puzzles
 Bob Weber Jr.'s True or False
 Bob Weber Jr.'s Trivia
 Bob Weber Jr.'s Other Puzzles
 Bob Weber Jr.'s Tagged Puzzles
 Find the Six Difference #4
 A Slylock Fox mystery puzzle reprint book titled Go Fun Slylock Fox Mystery Puzzles and a Spot Six Differences reprint book titled Go Fun Spot Six Differences have been released by Andrews McMeel Publishing.

Film adaptation
In September 2022, it was reported that King Features will be adapt Slylock Fox into an animated feature film. Evan Daugherty will write and produce and CJ Kettler will executive produce.

References

External links
The official Slylock Facebook Page
Oh, Brother! Bob Weber Jr.'s other comic strip

American comic strips
1987 comics debuts
Comics characters introduced in 1987
Sherlock Holmes pastiches
Ducks in literature
Dogs in literature
Comics about mice and rats
Comics about animals
Comics about foxes